The Crusaders is a team of DC Comics superheroes. The team was created by Bob Rozakis and Dick Ayers in the pages of Freedom Fighters #7 (March 1977).

Fictional team history
The Crusaders were a metafictional team of superheroes appearing in comic books on Earth-One during World War II.

The Crusaders appeared "for real" on Earth-One during the 1970s, offering their services to New York City District Attorney David Pearson to help capture the Freedom Fighters, who were at that time fugitives because they were believed to have been working with the villainous Silver Ghost. Pearson gave the Crusaders the authority to pursue Uncle Sam and his group after a report that they had caused a blackout in upstate New York.

After a lengthy fight, at the end of which the Crusaders are defeated, the Freedom Fighters ask the Crusaders how they became the comic book heroes of World War II. The group revealed that the Americommando had approached a group of young comic book collectors at a convention (Marvin, Lennie, Arch, and Roy) and had offered to recreate them as his former teammates, using a special device to transform them into their superpowered identities.

Meanwhile, the others had caught up to the Americommando and Martha Roberts. The villain dropped Martha, but the Ray was able to save her. He left Martha with Doll Man and headed off after the Americommando. The Ray again caught up with him and the sky battle between them burned off the Americommando's mask, revealing him to indeed be the Silver Ghost. The fight also attracted the attention of some state trooper helicopters, which swooped in to arrest both of them. The Ray accidentally hit one of the helicopters with an energy blast, prompting the troopers to open fire. The Ray was wounded and fell to Earth. The Silver Ghost gloated and left him to die.

The Ray was later rescued by Rod Reilly, the Golden Age Firebrand, who had emigrated to Earth-One some time prior to the Freedom Fighters.

The Crusaders fought among themselves until finally, after being deserted by the Americommando, they reveal their origins. They disappeared at the end of the story and there was no sign that they have lost their powers, but they never appear again. There was never an explanation of how the Silver Ghost gained super-strength or developed the technology to turn comic fans into superheroes.

Members
The Crusaders only appeared in Freedom Fighters #7–9. The names of the team are actually taken from obscure Golden Age superheroes:
The Americommando – in actually the Silver Ghost.
Barracuda 
Fireball 
Rusty 
Sparky 

Updated versions of the Americommando and Barracuda have since appeared in the miniseries Uncle Sam and the Freedom Fighters (2006–2007), as part of the team called First Strike. It is unknown if their Pre-Crisis history is still canonical.

In Lord Havok and the Extremists, Barracuda and the Americommando are also members of Earth-8's Meta-Militia, an updated version of the Champions of Angor.

In the 2007–2008 Uncle Sam series, a new team of Crusaders, gathered and controlled by the government, were introduced, including Captain Triumph, Citizen X, the Libertine, and Magno. After they are freed from their mind-controlled state, they team up with Uncle Sam and the Freedom Fighters. Citizen X and the Libertine are killed by alien insects, but Captain Triumph and Magno both go on to continue their superhero careers.

See also
Crusaders (Marvel Comics)
Justice Society of America
All-Star Squadron
Young All-Stars
Freedom Fighters
Seven Soldiers of Victory
Liberty Legion

References

External links
Obscure DC Guide: The Crusaders
Freedom Fighters bio and timeline
Index to the Freedom Fighters' 1970s adventures
Calling... The Crusaders!

Comics characters introduced in 1977
DC Comics superhero teams
United States-themed superheroes